Daroa Ben-Moide is a Papua New Guinean rugby league player who represented Papua New Guinea.

Playing career
Ben-Moide played for the Port Moresby Vipers.

He spent the 1988 season playing for Petone in the Wellington Rugby League competition. He also represented Wellington.

He played in six Test Matches for Papua New Guinea between 1988 and 1994.

References

Living people
Expatriate rugby league players in New Zealand
Papua New Guinea national rugby league team players
Papua New Guinean expatriate rugby league players
Papua New Guinean expatriate sportspeople in New Zealand
Papua New Guinean rugby league players
Petone Panthers players
Port Moresby Vipers players
Rugby league hookers
Rugby league props
Rugby league second-rows
Wellington rugby league team players
Year of birth missing (living people)